Aldo-keto reductase family 1 member C3 (AKR1C3), also known as 17β-hydroxysteroid dehydrogenase type 5 (17β-HSD5, HSD17B5) is a key steroidogenic enzyme that in humans is encoded by the AKR1C3 gene.

Function
This gene encodes a member of the aldo/keto reductase superfamily, which consists of more than 40 known enzymes and proteins. These enzymes catalyze the conversion of aldehydes and ketones to their corresponding alcohols by utilizing NADH and/or NADPH as cofactors. The enzymes display overlapping but distinct substrate specificity. This enzyme catalyzes the reduction of prostaglandin D2, prostaglandin H2, and phenanthrenequinone, and the oxidation of prostaglandin F2α to prostaglandin D2. It is also capable of metabolizing estrogen and progesterone.

AKR1C3 may play an important role in the development of allergic diseases such as asthma, and may also have a role in controlling cell growth and/or differentiation. This gene shares high sequence identity with three other gene members and is clustered with those three genes at chromosome 10p15-p14.

Pathology
AKR1C3 is overexpressed in prostate cancer (PCa) and is associated with the development of castration-resistant prostate cancer (CRPC). In addition, AKR1C3 overexpression may serve as a promising biomarker for prostate cancer progression.

References

External links

Further reading 

 
 
 
 
 
 
 
 
 
 
 
 
 
 
 
 
 

EC 1.1.1